S. occidentalis  may refer to:
 Sarcoscypha occidentalis, the stalked scarlet cup or western scarlet cup, a mushroom species
 Sceloporus occidentalis, the Western fence lizard, a reptile species common in California
 Senna occidentalis, a pantropical plant species
 Sorbus occidentalis, a tree species in the genus Sorbus found in Western North America

See also
 List of Latin and Greek words commonly used in systematic names#O